Nant Clogwyn y Geifr (English: Devil's Appendix) is the tallest single-drop waterfall in Wales and one of the tallest in the United Kingdom. It is a plunge style waterfall located on the Clogwyn y Geifr cliffs beside Twll Du in Cwm Idwal, Snowdonia, Wales.

Depending on flow and the ambient temperature, it can be either an ice climbing route, a single drop waterfall, or a broken waterfall.

References

Llandygai
Waterfalls of Gwynedd
Waterfalls of Snowdonia